Gura Jub-e Baba Karam (also Romanized as Gūrā Jūb-e Bābā Karam) is a village in Gurani Rural District, Gahvareh District, Dalahu County, Kermanshah Province, Iran. At the 2006 census, its population was 125, in 33 families.

References 

Populated places in Dalahu County